In the United States Armed Forces, a six-star rank is a proposed rank immediately superior to a five-star rank, possibly to be worn by the General of the Armies or Admiral of the Navy; however, this correlation was never officially recognized by the military or by Congress.

History 
As Congress was trying to create the rank of Fleet Admiral in 1944, the Navy wanted to re-establish and elevate Admiral of the Navy to be equivalent to General of the Armies, but they could not legally do so without a congressional act. The Navy's chief of naval personnel, Vice Admiral Randall Jacobs, testified before the Committee on Naval Affairs of the House of Representatives, recommending that the rank of Admiral of the Navy should be made equivalent to General of the Armies, but a previous bill submitted for its re-establishment on 25 February 1944, failed to be passed into law. Congress passed Pub.L. 78-482 on 14 December 1944, creating the rank of fleet admiral, without re-establishing the rank of Admiral of the Navy.

PostWorld War II
As such, the rank of Admiral of the Navy continued to be inactive. By 1955, the Navy concluded that the rank was honorary. And while they held to the belief that it was equivalent to General of the Armies, the Navy amended its regulations to establish fleet admiral as its highest achievable rank, adhering to the standard set by the law.

On 21 January 1955, a draft resolution was proposed to the U.S. Senate to authorize the then-U.S. President Dwight D. Eisenhower to appoint Douglas MacArthur, then a five-star General of the Army, to be elevated to the "six-star rank" of General of the Armies of the United States in recognition of the great services to his country", with "such appointment to take effect as of the seventy-fifth anniversary of his birth, 26 January 1955." The proposal had little chance of passing and was never voted on.

The rank of General of the Armies had previously been granted, in 1919, to active-duty four-star General John J. Pershing. The markings used to identify Pershing's new ranking as higher than general was a bank of four gold (rather than silver) stars.

In 1976, as part of commemorations for the U.S. Bicentennial, General George Washington was posthumously promoted to the rank of General of the Armies of the United States. Although the law did not actually specify the number of stars, some U.S. newspapers and members of Congress described this as a "six-star rank". His appointment had been to serve as "General and Commander in Chief of the Army of the United Colonies".

Gallery

See also
 Design of U.S. army insignia
 Heraldic origin of the use of five-pointed star
 Reichsmarschall

References 

6 (number)
Military ranks of the United States